Spot-backed puffbird is a common name for a broad species concept of Nystalus maculatus. The bird has been split into the following species:

Caatinga puffbird, endemic to eastern Brazil
Chaco puffbird, native to Argentina, Bolivia, Brazil, and Paraguay

Birds by common name